Trichromia cardinalis is a moth in the family Erebidae. It was described by Paul Dognin in 1899. It is found in French Guiana, Colombia, Ecuador and Bolivia.

References

Moths described in 1899
cardinalis